Cotidianul (meaning The Daily in English) is a Romanian language newspaper published in Bucharest, Romania.

History and profile
Founded by Ion Raţiu, Cotidianul was first published on 10 May 1991 and was the first privately held newspaper in Romania following the Romanian Revolution of 1989. The paper had its headquarters in Bucharest. It was published Monday to Saturday in Berliner format.

Cotidianul ceased print publication on 23 December 2009 due to financial difficulties, but remains active as an online news source. The owners announced the closure was temporary due to insolvency, but no buyers was found.

Since November 2016, the newspaper appears again in print.

Notable contributors
Cătălin Avramescu
Doru Buşcu
Adrian Cioroianu
Mirela Corlăţan
Răzvan Dumitrescu
Eugen Istodor
Ioan T. Morar
Octavian Paler
Magdalena Popa Buluc
Ovidiu Pecican
Andrei Marga
Jean-Lorin Sterian
Liviu Ioan Stoiciu
Cornel Nistorescu
Cristian Teodorescu
Vladimir Tismăneanu
Robert Turcescu
Cristian Oprea
Adrian Majuru
Traian Ungureanu
Ioan Vieru
Valerian Stan
Sever Voinescu

References

External links
  

1991 establishments in Romania
2009 disestablishments in Romania
Publications established in 1991
Publications disestablished in 2009
Defunct newspapers published in Romania
Newspapers published in Bucharest
Romanian-language newspapers
Daily newspapers published in Romania